Live/1975–85 is a live album by Bruce Springsteen & the E Street Band, consisting of 40 tracks recorded at various concerts between 1975 and 1985, and released as a box set by Columbia Records on November 10, 1986. It broke the record for advance orders, and, according to RIAA certification, is the second-best-selling live album in the US. Rolling Stone hailed it as "an embarrassment of riches", while The New York Times said it was "an unprecedented event in popular recording" and "monumental".

Background
Springsteen writes in the liner notes, "Jon Landau sent a four-song cassette of "Born in the U.S.A.", 'Seeds', "The River" and "War" down to my house with a note attached saying he 'thought we might have something here'. Over the following months we listened to 10 years of tapes, the music did the talkin', and this album and its story began to emerge. We hope you have as much fun with it as we did. I'd like to thank Jon for his friendship and perseverance and the E Street Band for 1,001 nights of comradeship and good rockin'. They're all about the best bunch of people you can have at your side when you're goin' on a long drive."

Release and performance
The album debuted at the top of the Billboard album chart, a then-rare occurrence that hadn't happened since Stevie Wonder's Songs in the Key of Life in 1976. Live 1975-85 also became the first five-record set to reach the Top 10, and the first to sell over a million copies. It was released as a box set of five vinyl records, three cassettes or three CDs. There was also an exclusive record club release of three 8-track cartridges. Being both long-awaited and highly anticipated, the album generated advance orders of more than 1.5 million copies, making it the largest dollar-value pre-order at the time. Despite some record stores opening early, they were still confronted with lines of fans. "We're selling them as fast as we can get them out of the box," said Don Bergentry, a New York retailer, adding, "This is the biggest thing I have ever seen in records."

Live/1975–85 is the second-best-selling live album in US history based on RIAA certification, which puts it at 13× platinum, trailing only Garth Brooks' Double Live. The box set's sales performance attracted considerable media attention at the time, immediately for setting records during the 1986 holiday shopping period, and subsequently for the sharp drop-off in sales in early 1987, leaving many retailers overstocked.

Two singles were released: "War" (a cover of the 1970 Edwin Starr hit), which reached No. 8 on the U.S. pop singles chart, and "Fire" (a Springsteen song that was a top 10 hit for The Pointer Sisters in 1979), which only reached No. 46, breaking Springsteen's string of eight consecutive Top 10 singles. Two non-album tracks — "Incident on 57th Street", recorded at Nassau Coliseum in December 1980, and "For You", taken from the July 1978 Roxy show — materialized on B-sides from the album's singles, and on a Japanese release, Live Collection. The music video for "War" was taken from the concert where it was recorded, while the video for "Fire" was from a completely unrelated 1986 acoustic performance at a Bridge School Benefit concert. A third video, for "Born to Run", was also released, which showed a melange of clips from the band's 1984–85 Born in the U.S.A. Tour.

Critical reception

Most reviews were overwhelmingly positive. The New York Times found it to be the "equivalent of an epic American novel, its story told in the ungrammatical, rough-hewn vocabulary of rock", possessing an "historical resonance that goes beyond pop culture". Rolling Stone said it was "an extraordinary demonstration of how Springsteen’s telepathic command of a concert audience has increased in direct proportion to the size of his stage."
It lauded Springsteen's "raw power, lyric honesty and spiritual determination". However, the magazine was not alone in highlighting the omission of several concert highlights, including "Prove It All Night" and Springsteen's rousing cover of John Fogerty's "Who'll Stop the Rain". Nor was it the only one to note that some superior unreleased songs, such as "The Fever", were ignored in favor of recent album tracks like "Darlington County".

Track listing

Vinyl

Notes
 – Mistitled as "4th of July, Ashbury Park" on some CD box sets.
 – Song never released by Springsteen before; the version on this release omits Bruce saying "All you bootleggers out there in radioland, roll your tapes" right before the song.
 – The short spoken intro is from July 7, 1978, at the Roxy Theatre, West Hollywood, California
 – This version edits out a long interpolation near the end which includes an early version of "Drive All Night"
 – Mistitled as "Caddillac Ranch" on the CD box set
 – Performed night after the election of Ronald Reagan to the United States presidency.
 – Song never released by Springsteen before, although recorded by others most notably by Patti Smith and, later, 10,000 Maniacs
 – The date in the liner notes is incorrect; the performance actually dates from the following night, December 29.
 – This performance previously released as the music video for "My Hometown" single
 – This performance was released in 1984 as the B-side of the "Cover Me" single. The song was written by Tom Waits and originally released on his Heartattack and Vine album.

CD
Disc 1
"Thunder Road" – 5:46
"Adam Raised a Cain" – 5:26
"Spirit in the Night" – 6:25
"4th of July, Asbury Park (Sandy)" – 6:34
"Paradise by the "C"" – 3:54
"Fire" – 2:51
"Growin' Up" – 7:58
"It's Hard to Be a Saint in the City" – 4:39
"Backstreets" – 7:35
"Rosalita (Come Out Tonight)" – 10:00
"Raise Your Hand" (Cropper/Floyd/Isbell) – 5:01
"Hungry Heart" – 4:30
"Two Hearts" – 3:06

Disc 2
"Cadillac Ranch" – 4:52
"You Can Look (But You Better Not Touch)" – 3:58
"Independence Day" – 5:08
"Badlands" – 5:17
"Because the Night" (Springsteen/Smith) – 5:19
"Candy's Room" – 3:19
"Darkness on the Edge of Town" – 4:19
"Racing in the Street" – 8:12
"This Land Is Your Land" (Guthrie) – 4:21
"Nebraska" – 4:18
"Johnny 99" – 4:24
"Reason to Believe" – 5:19
"Born in the U.S.A." – 6:10
"Seeds" – 5:14

Disc 3
"The River" – 11:42
"War" (Strong/Whitfield) – 4:53
"Darlington County" – 5:12
"Working on the Highway" – 4:04
"The Promised Land" – 5:36
"Cover Me" – 6:57
"I'm on Fire" – 4:26
"Bobby Jean" – 4:30
"My Hometown" – 5:13
"Born to Run" – 5:03
"No Surrender" – 4:41
"Tenth Avenue Freeze-Out" – 4:21
"Jersey Girl" (Waits) – 6:30

Personnel

Bruce Springsteen – vocals, electric guitar, harmonica, acoustic guitar

The E Street Band
Roy Bittan – piano, synthesizer, backing vocals
Clarence Clemons – saxophone, percussion, backing vocals
Danny Federici – organ, accordion, glockenspiel, piano, synthesizer, backing vocals
Nils Lofgren (beginning in 1984) – electric and acoustic guitar, backing vocals
Patti Scialfa (beginning in 1984) – backing vocals, synthesizer
Garry Tallent – bass guitar, backing vocals
Steve Van Zandt (through 1981) – electric guitar, acoustic guitar, backing vocals
Max Weinberg – drums

Guest musicians
Flo and Eddie (Howard Kaylan and Mark Volman) – backing vocals on "Hungry Heart"
The Miami Horns – horns on "Tenth Avenue Freeze-Out"
 Stan Harrison – tenor saxophone
 Eddie Manion – baritone saxophone
 Mark Pender – trumpet
 Richie "La Bamba" Rosenberg – trombone

Technical
Bruce Jackson – live sound engineer
Toby Scott – engineer, recording engineer
Jimmy Iovine - recording engineer
Bob Clearmountain - mixing

Charts

Certifications

See also
List of best-selling albums in the United States

References

External links
 

Bruce Springsteen live albums
1986 live albums
Albums produced by Jon Landau
Albums produced by Chuck Plotkin
1986 compilation albums
Bruce Springsteen compilation albums
Columbia Records compilation albums
Columbia Records live albums
Albums with cover art by Jimmy Wachtel